This is the complete list of Commonwealth Games medallists in diving from 1930 to 2018.

Men's

1 m springboard

3 m springboard

10 m platform

3 m synchronised springboard

10 m synchronised platform

Women's

1 m springboard

3 m springboard

10 m platform

3 m synchronised springboard

10 m synchronised platform

Mixed

3 m synchronised springboard

10 m synchronised platform

References
Results Database from the Commonwealth Games Federation

Diving
Medalists

Commonw